Toʻraqoʻrgʻon is a city in Namangan Region, Uzbekistan. It is the administrative center of Toʻraqoʻrgʻon District. The town population was 18,415 people in 1989, and 30,300 in 2016.

References

Populated places in Namangan Region
Cities in Uzbekistan